This is a list of fighter aces in World War II from France.

A 
Paul Abrioux 
Jean-Marie Accart
Marcel Albert
Maurice Amarger
Jacques André 
Jacques Andrieux  
Paul Audrain

B 
Georges Baptizet 
Paul Bardin  
Emile Becquet   
Didier Beguin  
Georges Berland  
Andrien Bernavon  
Camille-Jean Bertrand 
Maurice Bissoudre  
Georges Blanck 
Pierre Bleton  
 
Hubert Boitelet  
Maurice Bon  
Michel Boudier  
Marcel Bouguen  
André Bouhy  
Guy Bouttier  
André Breitenstein  
Jérémie Bressieux

C 
Yves Le Calvez  
Yves Carbon 
Jean Casenobe  
Noël Castelain  
Marc Castin 
Louis Castin  
Raymond Cazade  
René Challe  
Bernard Challe 
Maurice Challe 
Antoine de la Chapelle  
Charles Chesnais  
Raymond Clausse  
Pierre Clostermann 
Marcel Codet  
Edouard Corniglion-Molinier  
Germain Couteaud 
Joannes Cucumel  
Léon Cuffaut

D 

 Pierre Dechanet
 Louis Delfino
 André Delisle
  
 André Deniau
 James Denis
 Henri Dietrich
 Michel Dorance
 Pierre Dorcy
 Kleber Doublet
 Jean Doudies
 Jean Dugoujon
 Bernard Duperier
 Albert Durand
 Roger Duval

E 
Georges Elmlinger  
Paul Engler
Dory Ellul a.k.a. "Little Thief"

F 
Paul Faisandier 
Jean Fortin  
Henri Foucaud

G 
Edgar Gagnaire  
Georges Garde  
Gabriel Gauthier  
Roger Gerard 
Jean Girou 
Justin Gisclon 
Pierre Le Gloan
Robert G. Gouby 
Charles Goujon  
Jean Gourbeyre 
Georges Gras  
Henri Grimaud  
Michel Gruelle 
Abel Guides
Régis Guieu  
Edmond Guillaume

H 
Maurice-Marcel Hebrard  
Georges Henry  
Jean Hotelier  
Pierre Houze  
Henri Hugo  
Jean Hurtin  
Robert Huvet

I 
Robert Iribarne

J 
Gerard Jaussaud
Henri Jeandet  
Marcel Jeannaud 
Jules Joire

K 
Robert Killy  
Jan Klan  
Waclaw Krol

L 
Georges Labit 
William Laboussiere   
Francois Lachaux  
Gaston Lacombe
Jacques Lamblin  
André Lansoy 
Pierre Laureys
Alphonse Maurice Leblanc  
Émile Leblanc  
Marcel Lefèvre
Georges Lefol 
André Legentil 
André Legrand  
Georges Lemare  
Henri Liautard 
Albert Littolff
Martin Loi  
Pierre Lorillon   
Camille Louis

M
Michel Madon 
Jean Manceau  
Jean-Marie Maridor  
Louis Marie 
René Lucien Martin 
Robert Martin 
Pierre Matras 
Gabriel Mertzisen 
Edmond Marin la Meslée
Andre Micallef Grimaud  
Marie Hubert Monraisse  
Pierre Montet  
Amaury Montfort  
Paul de Montgolfier
François Morel
Antoine Moret  
Yves Mourier  
André Moynet 
Gérard Muselli

N 
André Naudy  
Jean Nedelec  
Edouard Le Nigen                   
Eugenius Nowakiewicz

O 
Leon Ougloff

P 
René Panhard  
Labazordière Marie-Louis Papin  
Pierre Parent 
Marcel Parniere  
Amédée Passemard  
Raoul Patureau-Mirand  
Jean Paulhan 
Dominique Penzini  
Frantisek Perina
Marcel Perrin  
Albert Petitjean-Roget 
Georges Pissotte  
Henri Planchard  
Camille Plubeau 
René Pomier-Layrargues  
Denis Ponteins  
Gérard Portalis  
Pierre Pouyade   
Roland de la Poype  
Jacques de Puybusque

R 
Henri Raphenne  
Raoul Rebière  
Jean-Marie Rey  
Léon Richard  
Ernest Richardin  
Joseph Risso  
Jacques Robiaud  
René Roger  
Maurice Romey  
Marcel Rouquette 
René Rubin 
Georges Ruchoux

S 
Hubert Irumberry de Salaberry 
Edouard Sales  
Pierre Salva  
Marie-Henri Satge  
Roger Saussol  
Jean Sauvage  
Roger Sauvage  
Reginald Sinclair  
Robert Starke  
Joseph Stehlik  
Marcel Steunou

T 
Gaël Taburet  
Maurice Tallent 
Roger Teillet 
Georges Tesseraud  
Emile Thierry  
Robert Thollon  
Robert Tourne  
Georges Tricaud
Aimé Troyes  
Jean-Louis Tulasne

U 
Adolphe Vybiral

V 
Georges Valentin  
Alois Vasatco 
Pierre Villaceque  
Pierre Villey  
Max Vinçotte

W 
 
Robert Williame

See also
 List of World War II aces by country

References

France  
World War II flying aces
 
Aces